"Whenever You're Near" is a song composed by Jack Blades and Tommy Shaw, recorded by American singer and actress Cher.

Song information
"Whenever You're Near" was one of three songs recorded exclusively for Cher's first European compilation, Greatest Hits: 1965–1992. The song was released as the album's second single in the United Kingdom and it managed to enter the official UK singles chart for one week, peaking at number 72. The song was released in three formats: CD, 7-inch vinyl, and 12-inch picture disc.

Critical reception
AllMusic called this song "gutsy."

Track listings
 European 7-inch and cassette single
 "Whenever You're Near" – 4:04
 "Could've Been You" – 3:26

 European 12-inch and CD single
 "Whenever You're Near" – 4:04
 "I'll Never Stop Loving You" – 3:57
 "Could've Been You" – 3:26
 "You Wouldn't Know Love" – 3:30

Charts

References

External links
 Official Cher site
 

Cher songs
1992 songs
1993 singles
Geffen Records singles
Songs written by Jack Blades
Songs written by Tommy Shaw